Risalpur Cantonment railway station is located in Risalpur, Pakistan.

See also
 List of railway stations in Pakistan
 Pakistan Railways
 Pakistan Locomotive Factory

References

Defunct railway stations in Pakistan
Railway stations in Nowshera District
Railway stations on Nowshera–Dargai Railway Line